Taman Sentosa Perdana is a township in Klang, Selangor, Malaysia. The town frequently floods, especially during the rainy season.

Klang District
Townships in Selangor